Roslyn is a town in northern Day County, South Dakota, United States. The population was 181 at the 2020 census.

Geography
Roslyn is located at  (45.496323, -97.490960).

Roslyn has been assigned the ZIP code 57261 and the FIPS place code 56380.

History
“Roslyn received its name from Old Roslyn, which was a post office and trading point established in 1882.  H.H. Russell, the first postmaster, took the name Roslyn from his native city in Scotland.”  Another source states the name Roslyn is an amalgamation of Rosholt and Lynn, the names of two lakes near the town site.

“In 1914, the Soo Line Railroad (Fairmount and Veblen Railway) was being built in the area.  In order to secure the line for the community, settlers adjoining the proposed line raised $60,000.  The coming of the railroad led to the selection of a new town site.  On August 17, 1914, the New Roslyn was plotted and Main Street was established.” Old Roslyn was eventually abandoned.

Demographics

2010 census
As of the census of 2010, there were 183 people, 77 households, and 42 families residing in the town. The racial makeup of the town was 97.8% White, 1.1% Native American, and 1.1% from two or more races.

There were 77 households, of which 15.6% had children under the age of 18 living with them, 44.2% were married couples living together, 6.5% had a female householder with no husband present, 3.9% had a male householder with no wife present, and 45.5% were non-families. 42.9% of all households were made up of individuals, and 26% had someone living alone who was 65 years of age or older. The average household size was 1.99 and the average family size was 2.71.

The median age in the town was 59.8 years. 16.9% of residents were under the age of 18; 4.9% were between the ages of 18 and 24; 13.6% were from 25 to 44; 23% were from 45 to 64; and 41.5% were 65 years of age or older. The gender makeup of the town was 47.0% male and 53.0% female.

2000 census
As of the census of 2000, there were 225 people, 93 households, and 50 families residing in the town. The population density was 1,128.5 people per square mile (434.4/km2). There were 109 housing units at an average density of 546.7 per square mile (210.4/km2). The racial makeup of the town was 97.78% White, 1.78% African American and 0.44% Native American.

There were 93 households, out of which 26.9% had children under the age of 18 living with them, 43.0% were married couples living together, 9.7% had a female householder with no husband present, and 46.2% were non-families. 40.9% of all households were made up of individuals, and 29.0% had someone living alone who was 65 years of age or older. The average household size was 2.05 and the average family size was 2.82.

In the town, the population was spread out, with 19.1% under the age of 18, 6.7% from 18 to 24, 14.7% from 25 to 44, 20.0% from 45 to 64, and 39.6% who were 65 years of age or older. The median age was 51 years. For every 100 females, there were 77.2 males. For every 100 females age 18 and over, there were 75.0 males.

The median income for a household in the town was $19,375, and the median income for a family was $24,375. Males had a median income of $30,625 versus $18,438 for females. The per capita income for the town was $11,527. About 14.0% of families and 18.4% of the population were below the poverty line, including 26.5% of those under the age of eighteen and 18.3% of those 65 or over.

Education
Due to Roslyn's small size and low population count, the town does not have any schools available directly local to Roslyn. There are numerous schools available in nearby towns.

Examples of schools in nearby towns:
 Webster Area School
 Langford Area Highschool

Attractions
Since 1999, Roslyn has been home to the International Vinegar Museum. Each year it hosts the International Vinegar Festival.

Notable people
 Myron Floren - Accordionist on The Lawrence Welk Show
 Henry A. Lardy - scientist

See also
 List of towns in South Dakota

References

External links

Towns in Day County, South Dakota
Towns in South Dakota